Stephanus is a masculine given name, a surname and a genus. It may refer to:

Sole name
 Stephanus I of Antioch, Patriarch of Antioch 342–344
 Stephanus of Byzantium, 6th century author of an important geographical dictionary
 Stephanus of Alexandria, 7th-century Byzantine philosopher, astronomer and teacher
 Stephanus (insect), a genus of parasitoid wasps in the family Stephanidae

Various members of the Estienne family of Parisian printers and scholars
 Henri Estienne (elder) (1470-1520), Parisian printer also known as Henricus Stephanus, father of Charles and Robert Estienne
 Robert Estienne (1503-1559), known as Robertus Stephanus in Latin, French printer and classical scholar in Paris
 Charles Estienne (1504–1564), Carolus Stephanus in Latin, an early exponent of the science of anatomy in France, brother of Robert Estienne
 Henri Estienne (1528 or 1531–1598), Henricus Stephanus in Latin, French printer and classical scholar, son of Robert Estienne

Given name
 Stephanus Ackermann (born 1985), Namibian cricketer
 Étienne Baluze (1630–1718), French scholar also known as Stephanus Baluzius
 Stoof Bezuidenhout (born 1986), South African rugby union player
 Stephanus Biermann (1918-2003), South African rear admiral
 Stef Blok (born 1964), Dutch politician
 Stephanus Brodericus (c. 1480–1539), Croatian–Hungarian bishop, diplomat and humanist writer
 Stephan Coetzee (born 1992, South African rugby union player
 Stephanus Jacobus du Toit (1847–1911), controversial South African nationalist, theologian, journalist and failed politician
 Stephanus Grobler (born 1982), South African former cricketer 
 Stephanus Paul Kruger (1825-1904), South African political and military figure, President of the South African Republic
 Stephanus Lombaard, South African athlete who competed in the 1996 Summer Paralympics
 Stephanus Le Roux Marais 1896-1979), South African composer
 Stephan Myburgh (born 1984), Dutch cricketer
 Fanie du Plessis (1930-2001), South African discus thrower and shot putter
 Stephanus Schoeman (1810–1890), State President of the South African Republic (1860-1862)
 Stephanus Van Cortlandt (1643–1700), first native-born mayor of New York City
 Stephanus Versluys (1694-1736), 21st Governor of Dutch Ceylon

Surname
 Willy Stephanus (born 1991), Namibian international footballer

See also
 Stephanus pagination of Plato and Plutarch
 Stephen
 Stefanus (disambiguation)

Masculine given names